Christopher J Morris (born 15 June 1962) is an English comedian, radio presenter, actor, and filmmaker. Known for his deadpan, dark humour, surrealism, and controversial subject matter, he has been praised by the British Film Institute for his "uncompromising, moralistic drive".

In the early 1990s, Morris teamed up with his radio producer Armando Iannucci to create On the Hour, a satire of news programmes. This was expanded into a television spin off, The Day Today, which launched the career of comedian Steve Coogan and has since been hailed as one of the most important satirical shows of the 1990s. Morris further developed the satirical news format with Brass Eye, which lampooned celebrities whilst focusing on themes such as crime and drugs. For many, the apotheosis of Morris' career was a Brass Eye special, which dealt with the moral panic surrounding paedophilia. It quickly became one of the most complained-about programmes in British television history, leading the Daily Mail to describe him as "the most loathed man on TV".

Meanwhile, Morris' postmodern sketch comedy and ambient music radio show Blue Jam, which had seen controversy similar to Brass Eye, helped him to gain a cult following. Blue Jam was adapted into the TV series Jam, which some hailed as "the most radical and original television programme broadcast in years", and he went on to win the BAFTA Award for Best Short Film after expanding a Blue Jam sketch into My Wrongs 8245–8249 & 117, which starred Paddy Considine. This was followed by Nathan Barley, a sitcom written in collaboration with a then little-known Charlie Brooker that satirised hipsters, which had low ratings but found success upon its DVD release. Morris followed this by joining the cast of the sitcom The IT Crowd, his first project in which he did not have writing or producing input.

In 2010, Morris directed his first feature-length film, Four Lions, which satirised Islamic terrorism through a group of inept British Muslims. Reception of the film was largely positive, earning Morris his second BAFTA Film Award, this time for Outstanding Debut. Since 2012, he has directed four episodes of Iannucci's political comedy Veep and appeared onscreen in The Double and Stewart Lee's Comedy Vehicle. His second feature-length film, The Day Shall Come, was released in 2019.

Early life
Christopher J Morris was born on 15 June 1962 in Colchester, Essex, the son of Rosemary Parrington and Paul Michael Morris. His father was a GP. Morris has a large red birthmark almost completely covering the left side of his face and neck, which he disguises with makeup when acting. He grew up in a Victorian farmhouse in the village of Buckden, Cambridgeshire, which he described as "very dull". He has two younger brothers, including theatre director Tom Morris. From an early age, he was a prankster and had a passion for radio. From the age of 10, he was educated at the independent Jesuit boarding school Stonyhurst College in Stonyhurst, Lancashire. He went to study zoology at the University of Bristol, where he gained a 2:1.

Career

Radio
On graduating, Morris pursued a career as a musician in various bands, for which he played the bass guitar. He then went to work for Radio West, a local radio station in Bristol. He then took up a news traineeship with BBC Radio Cambridgeshire, where he took advantage of access to editing and recording equipment to create elaborate spoofs and parodies. He also spent time in early 1987 hosting a 2–4pm afternoon show and finally ended up presenting Saturday morning show I.T.

In July 1987, he moved on to BBC Radio Bristol to present his own show No Known Cure, broadcast on Saturday and Sunday mornings. The show was surreal and satirical, with odd interviews conducted with unsuspecting members of the public. He was fired from Bristol in 1990 after "talking over the news bulletins and making silly noises". In 1988 he also joined, from its launch, Greater London Radio (GLR). He presented The Chris Morris Show on GLR until 1993, when one show got suspended after a sketch was broadcast involving a child "outing" celebrities.

In 1991, Morris joined Armando Iannucci's spoof news project On the Hour. Broadcast on BBC Radio 4, it saw him work alongside Iannucci, Steve Coogan, Stewart Lee, Richard Herring and Rebecca Front. In 1992, Morris hosted Danny Baker's Radio 5 Morning Edition show for a week whilst Baker was on holiday. In 1994, Morris began a weekly evening show, the Chris Morris Music Show, on BBC Radio 1 alongside Peter Baynham and 'man with a mobile phone' Paul Garner. In the shows, Morris perfected the spoof interview style that would become a central component of his Brass Eye programme. In the same year, Morris teamed up with Peter Cook (as Sir Arthur Streeb-Greebling), in a series of improvised conversations for BBC Radio 3 entitled Why Bother?.

Move into television and film

In 1994, a BBC 2 television series based on On the Hour was broadcast under the name The Day Today. The Day Today made a star of Morris, and marked the television debut of Steve Coogan's Alan Partridge character. The programme ended on a high after just one series, with Morris winning the 1994 British Comedy Award for Best Newcomer for his lead role as the Paxmanesque news anchor.

In 1996, Morris appeared on the daytime programme The Time, The Place, posing as an academic, Thurston Lowe, in a discussion entitled "Are British Men Lousy Lovers?", but was found out when a producer alerted the show's host, John Stapleton.

In 1997, the black humour which had featured in On the Hour and The Day Today became more prominent in Brass Eye, another spoof current affairs television documentary, shown on Channel 4. All three series satirised and exaggerated issues expected of news shows. The second episode of Brass Eye, for example, satirised drugs and the political rhetoric surrounding them. To help convey the satire, Morris invented a fictional drug by the name of "cake". In the episode, British celebrities and politicians describe the supposed symptoms in detail; David Amess mentioned the fictional drug at Parliament. In 2001, Morris' satirized the moral panic regarding pedophilia in the most controversial episode of Brass Eye, "Paedogeddon". Channel 4 apologised for the episode after receiving criticism from tabloids and around 3,000 complaints from viewers, which, at the time, was the most for an episode of British television. 

From 1997 to 1999, Morris created Blue Jam for BBC Radio 1, a surreal taboo-breaking radio show set to an ambient soundtrack. In 2000, this was followed by Jam, a television reworking. Morris released a 'remix' version of this, entitled Jaaaaam.

In 2002, Morris ventured into film, directing the short My Wrongs#8245–8249 & 117, adapted from a Blue Jam monologue about a man led astray by a sinister talking dog. It was the first film project of Warp Films, a branch of Warp Records. In 2002 it won the BAFTA for best short film. In 2005 Morris worked on a sitcom entitled Nathan Barley, based on the character created by Charlie Brooker for his website TVGoHome (Morris had contributed to TVGoHome on occasion, under the pseudonym 'Sid Peach'). Co-written by Brooker and Morris, the series was broadcast on Channel 4 in early 2005.

The IT Crowd and Comedy Vehicle
Morris was a cast member in The IT Crowd, a Channel 4 sitcom which focused on the information technology department of the fictional company Reynholm Industries. The series was written and directed by Graham Linehan (with whom Morris collaborated on The Day Today, Brass Eye and Jam) and produced by Ash Atalla. Morris played Denholm Reynholm, the eccentric managing director of the company. This marked the first time Morris has acted in a substantial role in a project which he has not developed himself. Morris' character appeared to leave the series during episode two of the second series. His character made a brief return in the first episode of the third series.

In November 2007, Morris wrote an article for The Observer in response to Ronan Bennett's article published six days earlier in The Guardian. Bennett's article, "Shame on us", accused the novelist Martin Amis of racism. Morris' response, "The absurd world of Martin Amis", was also highly critical of Amis; although he did not accede to Bennett's accusation of racism, Morris likened Amis to the Muslim cleric Abu Hamza (who was jailed for inciting racial hatred in 2006), suggesting that both men employ "mock erudition, vitriol and decontextualised quotes from the Qu'ran" to incite hatred.

Morris served as script editor for the 2009 series Stewart Lee's Comedy Vehicle, working with former colleagues Stewart Lee, Kevin Eldon and Armando Iannucci. He maintained this role for the second (2011) and third series (2014), also appearing as a mock interviewer dubbed the "hostile interrogator" in the third and fourth series.

Four Lions, Veep, and other appearances

Morris completed his debut feature film Four Lions in late 2009, a satire based on a group of Islamist terrorists in Sheffield.
It premiered at the Sundance Film Festival in January 2010 and was short-listed for the festival's World Cinema Narrative prize. The film (working title Boilerhouse) was picked up by Film Four. Morris told The Sunday Times that the film sought to do for Islamic terrorism what Dad's Army, the classic BBC comedy, did for the Nazis by showing them as "scary but also ridiculous".

In 2012, Morris directed the seventh and penultimate episode of the first season of Veep, an Armando Iannucci-devised American version of The Thick of It. In 2013, he returned to direct two episodes for the second season of Veep, and a further episode for season three in 2014.

In 2013, Morris appeared briefly in Richard Ayoade's The Double, a black comedy film based on the Fyodor Dostoyevsky novella of the same name. Morris had previously worked with Ayoade on Nathan Barley and The IT Crowd.

In February 2014, Morris made a surprise appearance at the beginning of a Stewart Lee live show, introducing the comedian with fictional anecdotes about their work together. The following month, Morris appeared in the third series of Stewart Lee's Comedy Vehicle as a "hostile interrogator", a role previously occupied by Armando Iannucci.

In December 2014, it was announced that a short radio collaboration with Noel Fielding and Richard Ayoade would be broadcast on BBC Radio 6. According to Fielding, the work had been in progress since around 2006. However, in January 2015 it was decided, 'in consultation with [Morris]', that the project was not yet complete, and so the intended broadcast did not go ahead.

The Day Shall Come
A statement released by Film4 in February 2016 made reference to funding what would be Morris' second feature film. In November 2017 it was reported that Morris had shot the movie, starring Anna Kendrick, in the Dominican Republic but the title was not made public. It was later reported in January 2018 that Jim Gaffigan and Rupert Friend had joined the cast of the still-untitled film, and that the plot would revolve around an FBI hostage situation gone wrong. The completed film, titled The Day Shall Come, had its world premiere at South by Southwest on 11 March 2019.

Music
Morris often co-writes and performs incidental music for his television shows, notably with Jam and the 'extended remix' version, Jaaaaam. In the early 1990s Morris contributed a Pixies parody track entitled "Motherbanger" to a flexi-disc given away with an edition of Select music magazine. Morris supplied sketches for British band Saint Etienne's 1993 single "You're in a Bad Way" (the sketch 'Spongbake' appears at the end of the 4th track on the CD single).

In 2000, he collaborated by mail with Amon Tobin to create the track "Bad Sex", which was released as a B-side on the Tobin single "Slowly".
British band Stereolab's song "Nothing to Do with Me" from their 2001 album Sound-Dust featured various lines from Chris Morris sketches as lyrics.

Style 
Ramsey Ess of Vulture described Morris' comedy style as "crass" and "shocking", but noted an "underlying morality" and integrity, as well as the humor being Morris' priority.

Recognition
In 2003, Morris was listed in The Observer as one of the 50 funniest acts in British comedy. In 2005, Channel 4 aired a show called The Comedian's Comedian in which foremost writers and performers of comedy ranked their 50 favourite acts. Morris was at number eleven. Morris won the BAFTA for outstanding debut with his film Four Lions. Adeel Akhtar and Nigel Lindsay collected the award in his absence. Lindsay stated that Morris had sent him a text message before they collected the award reading, 'Doused in petrol, Zippo at the ready'. In June 2012 Morris was placed at number 16 in the Top 100 People in UK Comedy.

In 2010, a biography, Disgusting Bliss: The Brass Eye of Chris Morris, was published. Written by Lucian Randall, the book depicted Morris as "brilliant but uncompromising", and a "frantic-minded perfectionist".

In November 2014, a three-hour retrospective of Morris' radio career was broadcast on BBC Radio 4 Extra under the title 'Raw Meat Radio', presented by Mary Anne Hobbs and featuring interviews with Armando Iannucci, Peter Baynham, Paul Garner, and others.

Awards
Morris won the Best TV Comedy Newcomer award from the British Comedy Awards in 1994 for his performance in The Day Today. He has won two BAFTA awards: the BAFTA Award for Best Short Film in 2002 for My Wrongs#8245–8249 & 117, and the BAFTA Award for Outstanding Debut by a British director, writer or producer in 2011 for Four Lions.

Personal life
Morris and his wife, actress-turned-literary agent Jo Unwin, live in the Brixton district of London. The pair met in 1984 at the Edinburgh Festival, when he was playing bass guitar for the Cambridge Footlights Revue and she was in a comedy troupe called the Millies. They have two sons, Charles and Frederick, both of whom were born in Lambeth in south London. 

Giving very few interviews and avoiding all social media, Morris has been described as a recluse. He can be heard in a 2008 podcast for CERN, being taken on a tour of the facility by the physicist Brian Cox. In 2010, he made numerous media appearances to promote and support Four Lions in both the UK and US, at one point appearing as a guest on Late Night with Jimmy Fallon. In 2019, two lengthy interviews conducted with Morris on The Adam Buxton Podcast were released in the run-up to the release of Morris's film The Day Shall Come.

Works

Film

Television

Other
 Various works at BBC Radio Cambridgeshire (1986–1987) (presenter)
 No Known Cure (July 1987 – March 1990, BBC Radio Bristol) (presenter)
 Chris Morris (1988–1993, BBC GLR) (presenter)
 Morning Edition (July 1990, BBC Radio 5) (guest presenter)
 The Chris Morris Christmas Show (25 December 1990, BBC Radio 1)
 On the Hour (1991–1992, BBC Radio 4) (co-writer, performer)
 It's Only TV (September 1992, LWT) (unbroadcast pilot)
 Why Bother? (1994, BBC Radio 3) (performer, editor)
 The Chris Morris Music Show (1994, BBC Radio 1) (presenter)
 Blue Jam (1997–1999, BBC Radio 1) (writer, director, performer, editor)
 Second Class Male/Time To Go (1999, newspaper column for The Observer)
 The Smokehammer (2002, website)
 Absolute Atrocity Special (2002, newspaper pullout for The Observer)

References

External links
 
 

1962 births
Living people
Alumni of the University of Bristol
English male comedians
English radio DJs
English radio writers
English satirists
English screenwriters
English male screenwriters
People educated at Stonyhurst College
People from Colchester
People from Buckden, Cambridgeshire
English film directors
Outstanding Debut by a British Writer, Director or Producer BAFTA Award winners